Hans-Martin Majewski (14 January 1911 – 1 January 1997) was a German composer of film scores.

Selected filmography

References

Bibliography
 Bock, Hans-Michael & Bergfelder, Tim. The Concise Cinegraph: Encyclopaedia of German Cinema. Berghahn Books, 2009.

External links

1911 births
1997 deaths
20th-century German composers
German film score composers
People from Sławno
People from the Province of Pomerania